Waterman Broadcasting Corporation is a small American television broadcasting company based in Fort Myers, Florida. It was founded in 1978 in Fort Myers when it purchased WBBH from Broadcast Telecasting Services, Inc. 

It was founded by Bernard Waterman .

Stations owned by Waterman

Current 
 WBBH-TV channel 20/cable 2 (NBC), Fort Myers, Florida
 WZVN-TV channel 26/cable 7 (ABC), Naples, Florida (owned by Montclair Communications; operated by Waterman on a local marketing agreement)

Former 
 WVIR-TV channel 29/cable 4 (NBC/The CW/WeatherNation TV), Charlottesville, Virginia (now owned by Gray Television)

Waterman Broadcasting Administration
Steven Pontius - Executive Vice President/ General Manager   
Gerry Poppe - Vice President and Chief Financial Officer
Darrel Lieze-Adams - Vice President, News 
Bob Beville -  Vice President, Sales

External links
Waterman Broadcasting Corporation
 NBC 2 WBBH-TV
 ABC 7 WZVN-TV

Television broadcasting companies of the United States
Companies based in Florida
Fort Myers, Florida
1978 establishments in Florida